Yang Shujing (born 5 October 1984) is a former professional tennis player from China.

Tennis career
Shujing played four Fed Cup ties for China and won four of her six matches, two each in singles and doubles, all in the 2004 Fed Cup competition.

On the professional tour, she had a top ranking of 462 in singles and 154 in doubles. She won six ITF doubles titles and was runner-up in the doubles at the Guangzhou International Open in 2004, on her WTA Tour main-draw debut. Teaming up with Yu Ying, the pair beat top seeds Nicole Pratt and Tamarine Tanasugarn en route to the final, which they lost to another Chinese combination, Li Ting and Sun Tiantian.

WTA career finals

Doubles: 1 (runner-up)

ITF Circuit finals

Doubles: 9 (6–3)

See also
 List of China Fed Cup team representatives

References

External links
 
 
 

1984 births
Living people
Chinese female tennis players
21st-century Chinese women